Gauze was a Japanese hardcore punk band formed in September 1981. Having released five albums as well as appearing on numerous compilations since their formation, the band has had a major impact on the Japanese hardcore punk scene.

History

Gauze was formed in the autumn of 1981.

According to Gauze's bassist, Shin, their initial goal was to play as fast as possible. They attempted to give the impression of playing fast without actually playing fast.

The first Gauze recordings are the tracks from the 1982 City Rocker compilation LP, which featured 10 of their songs. Their debut album, Fuck Heads, was released June 1985. Shortly after, they recorded Equalizing Distort, which was released in March 1986. They released the Genkai Wa Doko Da ("What’s the Limit?") LP in 1989, and in 1991 they played a 10th anniversary gig, where they played three sets covering the 3 periods they had gone through in the previous 10 years. They played 51 songs over these 3 sets. In 1996, they began a US tour, though it lasted just three shows - a fourth was scheduled, but was cancelled. They played at Gilman St. in Berkeley, at the Bomb Shelter in Minneapolis and in Chicago at the Fireside Bowl. They also recorded songs for a 7" that came out on Prank a little after this, while they were in SF.

, Gauze performed a live version of every album they recorded. They used older instruments to replicate  the sounds from previous albums. As of 2019, they have started touring Japan again.

The band dissolved in November 2022.

Albums
Fuckheads 12" LP (1985)
Equalizing Distort 12" LP (1986)
 (1989)
Low Charge 7" EP (1996) on Prank Records
 (1997)
 (2007)
言いたかねえけど目糞鼻糞 CD on XXX Records (2021)

External links and references
Gauze's home page
Gauze's setlist and discography
A Biography

References

Japanese crust and d-beat groups
Musical groups disestablished in 2022
Musical groups established in 1981